Associazione Sportiva Petrarca Scherma is a fencing team based in Padua, Italy.

History
The team born in 1968 by Vincenzo Pinton, Mauro Racca and Carlo Turcato.

Notable players
 Giovanni Battista Coletti
 Attilio Calatroni
 Gianfranco Dalla Barba
 Marco Marin

Notable coaches
 Ryszard Zub

External links
Official Website

Fencing organizations